Manoel Maria Evangelista Barbosa dos Santos (born 29 February 1948), known as Manoel Maria, is a Brazilian retired footballer and football manager. He played mainly as a right winger, and competed in the men's tournament at the 1968 Summer Olympics.

His son, Aarão Alves, is also a manager.

Honours
Santos
Campeonato Paulista: 1968, 1969, 1973
Torneio Roberto Gomes Pedrosa: 1968
Recopa Sudamericana: 1968
Intercontinental Supercup: 1968

References

External links

1948 births
Living people
Sportspeople from Belém
Brazilian footballers
Association football wingers
Tuna Luso Brasileira players
Santos FC players
Associação Atlética Portuguesa (Santos) players
Paysandu Sport Club players
Colorado Esporte Clube players
Esporte Clube Noroeste players
Argentine Primera División players
Racing Club de Avellaneda footballers
New York Cosmos players
Olympic footballers of Brazil
Footballers at the 1968 Summer Olympics
Brazilian expatriate footballers
Brazilian expatriate sportspeople in Argentina
Brazilian expatriate sportspeople in the United States
Expatriate footballers in Argentina
Expatriate soccer players in the United States
Brazilian football managers
Santos FC (women) managers